Top Shelf Coffee, Inc. is an American privately owned and operated coffee company headquartered in Warren, Ohio. Top Shelf Coffee was founded in 1994 as Top Shelf Coffee and Foods. The company was a medium scale business, operating mostly within Ohio; serving local factories, restaurants and coffee shops both small and large.

In 2009, the company was in talks with the NBA to produce coffee with NBA graphics on the packaging.

Facility
Top Shelf Coffee currently occupies an  building where it roasts, grinds and packages coffee.

References

External links
Official Website
Mobile Coffee Van
Espresso International

Coffee brands
Warren, Ohio
Companies based in Ohio
Food and drink companies established in 1994
Coffee companies of the United States
1994 establishments in Ohio